Edward Meshekoff (1917 in Bronx, New York City – 2010) was an American artist, illustrator and designer.

A graduate of the University of California, Los Angeles, Meshekoff worked and lived in both Los Angeles and New York City.

In 1957 Meshekoff designed a pair of mosaic map murals of New York City's five boroughs installed on the walls of what was then a newly built Information Center located on a traffic island in the center of Times Square (in more recent years, the building has served as a NYPD police substation.) As of 2016, Meshekoff's mosaic maps are scheduled for restoration and move to an as-yet-undetermined new location.

Edward worked with Philip Johnson on larger commissions including; The south building of Lincoln Center, formerly known as The NY State Theater (home to NYC Ballet) and The Kreeger Museum. He was commissioned by other notable architects including Alfred Easton Poor.

References

American illustrators
American muralists
1917 births
2010 deaths
University of California, Los Angeles alumni